The Fangoria Chainsaw Awards are an award ceremony that goes out to horror films and thriller films.  Beginning in 1992 the awards were expanded and an annual ceremony was inaugurated to give out the awards. The nominees were announced in February 2017 and the winners are to be announced in late April. "The winners are followed by the runners-up."

Motion picture winners and nominees

Films with multiple nominations

Television winners and nominees

TV Series with multiple nominations

References

Fangoria Chainsaw Awards
Fangoria